Charles Becker (June 24, 1840 – January 2, 1908) was a German American politician from Bavaria. Immigrating to Illinois with his family in 1851, Becker attended public schools then worked for the Harrison Machine Works. He fought in the Civil War, losing his leg at the Battle of Pea Ridge. He returned to Belleville and became a prominent citizen, holding several local offices before he was elected Illinois Treasurer (1889–1891).

Biography
Charles Becker was born in Rockenhausen, Bavaria, on June 24, 1840. In 1851, his family immigrated to the United States, settling in Belleville, Illinois. Becker attended public school, then found employment with the Harrison Machine Works when he was fifteen. He became a skilled molder and worked there until the outbreak of the Civil War in 1861. Becker enlisted in Company B of the 12th Missouri Volunteer Infantry. At the Battle of Pea Ridge on March 8, 1862, Becker took a wound in the right thigh. The leg was amputated and Becker was discharged from service.

Returning to Belleville, Becker attended school for a while and then returned to the Harrison Machine Works as an officer. Becker was noted for his efficient management and in 1866, he was elected Collector of Taxes and Sheriff of St. Clair County, serving for two years. When his term expired, he ran a brewery with a Mr. Echardt for four years. In 1872, he was elected Circuit Clerk and Recorder of Deeds, serving two four-year terms. In the meantime, he became president of the Belleville Stone Works and the Pump & Skein Works. In 1884, Becker was elected chairman of the county Republican Party. Becker was elected Illinois Treasurer in 1889, serving a two-year term.

Charles Becker married Louisa Fleischbein on January 23, 1864. They had six children, five surviving to adulthood: Bertha, Casimir, Gustave, Arthur, and Ray. He died in Belleville on January 2, 1908, and was buried in Walnut Hill Cemetery.

References

1840 births
1908 deaths
Illinois Republicans
People of Illinois in the American Civil War
People from Belleville, Illinois
People from Donnersbergkreis
State treasurers of Illinois
German emigrants to the United States